Bombotown is a village and suburb of Robertsport in Grand Cape Mount County on the northern coast of Liberia.

It is located about 300m from the city.

External links
Geody.com

Populated places in Liberia
Grand Cape Mount County